Stephen Thomas "Web" Koehler (born April 15, 1964) is a United States Navy vice admiral who serves as the director for strategy, plans, and policy of the Joint Staff. He previously  served as the 31st Commander of the United States Third Fleet.

Early life and education
Koehler was born in Norfolk, Virginia and raised in San Diego, where he graduated from Mt. Carmel High School in 1982. He earned a Bachelor of Science in Physics from the University of Colorado Boulder in 1986. Koehler holds a master's degree in National Security and Strategic Studies from the Naval War College and also graduated from the Joint Staff College and the Navy Nuclear Power Program.

Naval career
Koehler was commissioned through the Naval Reserve Officers Training Corps (NROTC) in 1986 and designated a naval aviator in March 1989. His command tours include the Pukin' Dogs of Strike Fighter Squadron (VFA) 143, and Carrier Strike Group 9.
He was the Director of Operations of the United States Indo-Pacific Command from June 2018 to October 2020.

 

Koehler was originally slated to replace Andrew L. Lewis as commander of the United States Second Fleet and Joint Force Command Norfolk in March 2020; despite being confirmed by the Senate, he did not assume command.

In April 2022, Koehler was nominated for assignment director for strategy, plans, and policy of the Joint Staff and senior member of the Military Staff Committee of the United Nations.

Awards and decorations

References

1964 births
Living people
People from Norfolk, Virginia
People from San Diego
University of Colorado Boulder alumni
Military personnel from California
United States Naval Aviators
Naval War College alumni
Recipients of the Legion of Merit
United States Navy admirals
Recipients of the Defense Superior Service Medal